Zapatero District is one of eleven districts of the province Lamas in Peru.

From the standpoint of hierarchical Church Catholic part of the Prelature Moyobamba, suffragan of the Metropolitan Trujillo and assigned by Holy See to Archdiocese of Toledo in Spain .

References